The 2014–15 Saudi Crown Prince Cup was the 40th season of the Saudi Crown Prince Cup since its establishment in 1957. This season's competition featured a total of 30 teams, 14 teams from the Pro League, and 16 teams from the First Division.

The holders were Al-Nassr who beat Al-Hilal 2–1 in the previous season's final on 1 February 2014. Al-Nassr were knocked out in the semi-finals by Al-Ahli.

The 2015 Crown Prince Cup Final was played between Al-Ahli and Al-Hilal at the King Fahd International Stadium in Riyadh. Al-Ahli defeated Al-Hilal 2–1 in the final to win their sixth Crown Prince Cup title and their first since 2007.

First stage

Preliminary round
The Preliminary round fixtures were played on 9, 11, 12 & 21 August and 15 September 2014. Al-Ittihad's match was postponed due to their participation in the 2014 AFC Champions League quarter-finals. All times are local, AST (UTC+3).

Second stage

Bracket

Note:     H: Home team,   A: Away team

Round of 16
The Round of 16 fixtures were played on 22 & 23 September 2014. The Al-Ittihad v Al-Hilal match was delayed to 23 December 2014 due to Al-Hilal's participation in the semi-finals of the 2014 AFC Champions League. All times are local, AST (UTC+3).

Quarter-finals
The Quarter-finals fixtures were played on 23 & 24 December 2014. The Al-Hilal v Hetten match was delayed due to Al-Hilal's participation in the 2014 AFC Champions League Final. All times are local, AST (UTC+3).

Semi-finals
The Semi-finals fixtures were played on 9 February 2015. All times are local, AST (UTC+3).

Final

The final was held on 13 February 2015 in the King Fahd International Stadium in Riyadh. All times are local, AST (UTC+3).

Top goalscorers
As of 13 February 2015

References

Saudi Crown Prince Cup seasons
2014–15 domestic association football cups
Crown Prince Cup